Sports clubs based in Patras, Greece.

Main sports clubs

 (*) Season 2014-15

Clubs

 Apollon Patras - basketball: second division, volleyball: third division
 Apolloniada Patras - regional championship
 Achilleas Patras AC - regional championship
 AEK Patras FC - regional championship
 Aetos Patras - regional championship
 Aris Patras
 A.O. Ampelokipi Patras
 A.O. Anagenisi Patras
 Agyia FC - Patras (Agyia), regional championship
 Albatross Glyfadas Patras - regional championship
 AS Apollo Eglikadas - regional championship
 Aris - regional championship
 Astrapis Psarofai - Patras (Psarofai), regional championship
 Atlantida Girokomeiou - Patras, regional championship
 Atromitos Patras F.C. - regional championship
 Atromitos Zarouchleika Patras - Patras (Zarouchleika) - regional championship
 Dafni FC
 Dafni Kalavrita
 Diakopto AC - Diakopto - regional championship
 Doxa Chalandritsas FC - Chalandritsa, regional championship
 Doxa Paralias - Paralia, regional championship
 Doxa Niforeika
 Elpida Egklykadas - Eglykada, regional championship
 Esperos AOPA Patras - basketball, fourth division
 Ethnikos Patras - regional championship
 Filia Patras - regional championship
 Galini Patras
 Iraklis Patras - regional championship
 Iraklis Leykas
 Kypros Patron AC - regional championship
 P.A.O. Kritikon Patras
 NE Patras - Patras, men water polo: second division, women water polo: first division
 NO Patras - Patras, water polo: first division
 APS Olympiakos - regional championship
 Olympiakos Patras F.C. - regional championship
 Olympiada Patras, basketball: second division, volleyball: third division
 A.O. Omonia Patras
 Ormi Patras - handball: first division
 Pampatraikos - regional championship
 Panachaiki - Patras, football: second division, volleyball: first division, basketball: fourth division
 Panionios Achilleas Agyias AU - Patras (Agyia), regional championship
 Pelopas Patras
 Perivola A.O.
 APS Patrai - Patras, football: fourth division
 PAS Patraikos - regional championship
 E.A. Patras - Patras, volleyball: first division, basketball: fourth division
 Patreas - regional championship
 Pigasos Begoulakiou FC, regional championship
 Pirsos Patras
 Proodevtiki - regional championship
 A.O. Psilalonia Patras
 Skakistikos Omilos Patras
 Thyella Patras F.C. - football, regional championship
 A.P.S. Zavlani - football, fourth division

Elsewhere in the municipality
 Panachaikos Souli

Defunct teams

 Foinikas Patras - Patras
 Patraikos A.O. - football, merged in 2005, now part of Panachaiki
 Poseidonas Patras AU - women water polo, now part of NE Patras
 Thriamvos Patras - water polo, now part of NE Patras